The Telstra Business Awards is an Australian awards programme started in 1992. The Telstra Business Awards is an independent Awards programme designed to recognise and promote excellence, best practice and innovation in the business community.

The Telstra Business Awards Winners

2005

National Awardees 
Telstra Australian Business of the Year – Whitech Software Solutions (NSW)
Telstra Australian Medium Business Award – Whitech Software Solutions (NSW)
Telstra Australian Small Business Award – Ripe Maternity Wear (VIC)
Telstra Australian Micro-Business Award – Research One Pty. Ltd. (ACT)
Telstra Australian Regional Business Award – Trailers 2000 Pty. Ltd. (QLD)
Telstra Australian Innovation Award – SRK Consulting (WA)

Business of the Year Award – State Winners 
Australian Capital Territory Business of the Year – Research One Pty. Ltd.
New South Wales Business of the Year – Whitech Software Solutions
Queensland Business of the Year – Daintree Discovery Centre
Western Australian Business of the Year – Agmaster
South Australian Business of the Year – Tonkin Consulting
Victorian Business of the Year – Production Parts Pty. Ltd.
Northern Territory Business of the Year – Air & Gas Systems Pty. Ltd.
Tasmanian Business of the Year – Impact Solutions International Pty. Ltd.

Small Business Award – State Winners 
Australian Capital Territory Small Business Award – THE hairdressing
New South Wales Small Business Award – Provecta Process Automation Pty. Ltd.
Queensland Small Business Award – Daintree Discovery Centre
Western Australian Small Business Award – Agmaster
South Australian Small Business Award – Site Academy
Victorian Small Business Award – Ripe Maternity Wear
Northern Territory Small Business – Award Air & Gas Systems Pty. Ltd.
Tasmanian Small Business Award – Keith Ives Logistics Pty. Ltd.

Medium Business Award – State Winners  
Australian Capital Territory Medium Business Award – Achieve, Corp
New South Wales Medium Business Award – Whitech Software Solutions
Queensland Medium Business Award – Trailers 2000 Pty. Ltd.
Western Australian Medium Business Award – Commtech Wireless Pty. Ltd.
South Australian Medium Business Award – REDARC Electronics Pty. Ltd.
Victorian Medium Business Award – N/A 
Northern Territory Medium Business Award – Northpharm Pty. Ltd.
Tasmanian Medium Business Award – Aus-Tech Composites Pty. Ltd.

Micro-Business Award – State Winners 
Australian Capital Territory Medium Business Award – Research One Pty. Ltd.
New South Wales Micro-Business Award – The Pharmaceutical Locum Company P/L
Queensland Micro-Business Award – Freeman Productions (Australia) Pty. Ltd.
Western Australian Micro-Business Award – Flying Flowers
South Australian Micro-Business Award – Nicknack Creative Pty Ltd
Victorian Micro-Business Award – Sync International Pty. Ltd.
Northern Territory Micro-Business Award – BHE Pty Ltd T/As Basil Hall Editions
Tasmanian Micro-Business Award – Impact Solutions International Pty. Ltd.

Innovation Award – State Winners 
Australian Capital Territory Innovation Award – ZOO
New South Wales Innovation Award – InfoComp Pty Ltd
Queensland Innovation Award – GroundProbe Pty. Ltd.
Western Australian Innovation Award – SRK Consulting
South Australian Innovation Award – Tonkin Consulting
Victorian Innovation Award – Country Life Bakery
Northern Territory Innovation Award – Colemans Printing
Tasmanian Innovation Award – N/A

2006
The Westpac Business Owner of the Year and Hudson Business Award National were presented in 2006 for the first and last times in the Telstra Business Awards to date.

National Awardees 
Telstra Australian Business of the Year – Safetech Pty. Ltd. (VIC)
Telstra Australian Medium Business Award – NA (not awarded)
Telstra Australian Small Business Award – NA (not awarded)
Telstra Australian Micro-Business Award – Rent-a-home.com.au (NSW)
Telstra Australian Regional Business Award – Perry Trade Services (SA)
Telstra Australian Innovation Award – Microskin International Pty. Ltd. (QLD)
Telstra Australian Private and Corporate Sector Award – Imagination Entertainment (SA)
Westpac Business Owner of the Year – Stepping Stones Children's Services (NSW)
Hudson Business Award National – Lifestyle Villages (WA)

Business of the Year Award – State Winners 
Australian Capital Territory Business of the Year – CRE8IVE
New South Wales Business of the Year – the white agency
Queensland Business of the Year – Wesley Corporate Health
Western Australian Business of the Year – National Lifestyle Villages
South Australian Business of the Year – CQR Consulting
Victorian Business of the Year – Safetech Pty. Ltd.
Northern Territory Business of the Year – Avant Pty. Ltd.
Tasmanian Business of the Year – Stepping Stones Children's Services

Small Business Award – State Winners 
Australian Capital Territory Small Business Award – CRE8IVE
New South Wales Small Business Award – The Purist Company Pty. Ltd. / the white agency
Queensland Small Business Award – Medimobile Pty Ltd / Wesley Corporate Health
Western Australian Small Business Award – Simulus
South Australian Small Business Award – CQR Consulting
Victorian Small Business Award – Clyne Foods
Northern Territory Small Business Award – Avant Pty. Ltd.
Tasmanian Small Business Award – Winemaking Tasmania Pty Ltd

Medium Business Award – State Winners  
Australian Capital Territory Medium Business Award – Brindabella Airlines
New South Wales Medium Business Award – N/A
Queensland Medium Business Award – N/A
Western Australian Medium Business Award – Bell Fire Equipment Company Pty. Ltd.
South Australian Medium Business Award – Perry Trade Services
Victorian Medium Business Award – AWMA Pty. Ltd.
Northern Territory Medium Business Award – N/A
Tasmanian Medium Business Award – N/A

Micro-Business Award – State Winners 
Australian Capital Territory Micro-Business Award – Power Initiatives
New South Wales Micro-Business Award – Rent-A-Home.com.au
Queensland Micro-Business Award – Entitled Clothing Company
Western Australian Micro-Business Award – MatchPoint Consulting
South Australian Micro-Business Award – Getaways Reservation Service
Victorian Micro-Business Award – The Coaching Institute
Northern Territory Micro-Business Award – Boyanton Advertising
Tasmanian Micro-Business Award – Grindelwald Kennels & Cattery

Innovation Award – State Winners 
Australian Capital Territory Innovation Award – Brindabella Airlines
New South Wales Innovation Award – North Coast Breast Centre Pty. Ltd.
Queensland Innovation Award – Microskin International Pty. Ltd.
Western Australian Innovation Award – Simulus
South Australian Innovation Award – Imagination Entertainment
Victorian Innovation Award – Safetech Pty. Ltd.
Northern Territory Innovation Award – N/A
Tasmanian Innovation Award – Tamar River Cruises

Private and Corporate Sector Award – State Winners 
New South Wales Private and Corporate Sector Award – SmartSalary Pty. Ltd.
South Australian Private and Corporate Sector Award – Imagination Entertainment
Tasmanian Private and Corporate Sector Award – Matthews Constructions Pty. Ltd.

2007
The Telstra Australian Private and Corporate Sector Award was presented in 2007 for the first and last time in the Telstra Business Awards to date.

National Awardees 
Telstra Australian Business of the Year – Brookfarm (NSW) / SRA Information Technology Pty Ltd (NT)
Telstra Australian Medium Business Award – AVKO Mining (WA) / Platinum Electrical Contractors (NSW)
Telstra Australian Small Business Award – SRA Information Technology Pty. Ltd. (NT)
Telstra Australian Micro-Business Award – propertybuyer (NSW)
Telstra Australian Regional Business Award – AVKO Mining (WA)
Telstra Australian Innovation Award – SRA Information Technology Pty. Ltd. (NT)
Telstra Australian Private and Corporate Sector Award – Danley Construction Products Pty. Ltd. (QLD)

Business of the Year Award – State Winners 
Australian Capital Territory Business of the Year – Vogue Pergolas Pty Ltd
New South Wales Business of the Year – Brookfarm
Queensland Business of the Year – vending solutions
Western Australian Business of the Year – AVKO Mining Pty. Ltd.
South Australian Business of the Year – Adelaide Clutch Services
Victorian Business of the Year – WBP Property Group
Northern Territory Business of the Year – SRA Information Technology Pty. Ltd.
Tasmanian Business of the Year – Irrigation Tasmania Pty. Ltd.

Small Business Award – State Winners 
Australian Capital Territory Small Business Award – stratsec
New South Wales Small Business Award – Brookfarm / Unistraw International Limited
Queensland Small Business Award – Advanced Metal Turning Pty. Ltd.
Western Australian Small Business Award – Market Creations Pty. Ltd.
South Australian Small Business Award – Adelaide Clutch Services
Victorian Small Business Award – Gorman Industries Pty Ltd / No Fuss Events Pty Ltd
Northern Territory Small Business Award – Northern Stainless Pty. Ltd. / SRA Information Technology Pty. Ltd.
Tasmanian Small Business Award – Blue Skies Dining

Medium Business Award – State Winners  
Australian Capital Territory Medium Business Award – Instyle Indoor Plant Hire
New South Wales Medium Business Award – Platinum Electrical Contractors
Queensland Medium Business Award – N/A 
Western Australian Medium Business Award – Australian Pressure Testing Services / AVKO Mining Pty. Ltd.
South Australian Medium Business Award – Bradford College Pty. Ltd.
Victorian Medium Business Award – WBP Property Group
Northern Territory Medium Business Award – N TESS Fire Consultants
Tasmanian Medium Business Award – N/A

Micro-Business Award – State Winners 
Australian Capital Territory Micro-Business Award – Vogue Pergolas Pty. Ltd.
New South Wales Micro-Business Award – propertybuyer
Queensland Micro-Business Award – J2 ideas & events
Western Australian Micro-Business Award – Ebiz Solutions
South Australian Micro-Business Award – Eye-Catcher Innovations
Victorian Micro-Business Award – Ripple Products Pty. Ltd.
Northern Territory Micro-Business Award – Alice Springs Physiotherapy & Sports Injury Clinic
Tasmanian Micro-Business Award – Creative One Studio / Irrigation Tasmania Pty. Ltd.

Innovation Award – State Winners 
Australian Capital Territory Innovation Award – Instyle Indoor Plant Hire
New South Wales Innovation Award – Unistraw International Limited
Queensland Innovation Award – Building Solutions Pty. Ltd.
Western Australian Innovation Award – Imaging the South
South Australian Innovation Award – Eye-Catcher Innovations
Victorian Innovation Award – Inzenius
Northern Territory Innovation Award – SRA Information Technology Pty. Ltd.
Tasmanian Innovation Award – Autech Software & Design

Private and Corporate Sector Award – State Winners 
Australian Capital Territory Private and Corporate Sector Award – Aspen Medical
New South Wales Private and Corporate Sector Award – ScenicWorld Blue Mountains
Queensland Private and Corporate Sector Award – Danley Construction Products Pty. Ltd. / vending solutions
South Australian Private and Corporate Sector Award – Toop & Toop Real Estate

2008
The Telstra Social Responsibility Award was inaugurated in 2008.

National Awardees 
Telstra Australian Business of the Year – Machinery Automation & Robotics (NSW)
Telstra Australian Medium Business Award – Atlantic Group (v) (VIC) / Centor Architectural (QLD)
Telstra Australian Small Business Award – Bruny Island Charters and Tasman Island Cruises (TAS)
Telstra Australian Micro-Business Award – Find a babysitter.com.au (VIC)
Telstra Australian Regional Business Award – Clearmake (QLD)
Telstra Australian Social Responsibility Award – Bruny Island Charters and Tasman Island Cruises (TAS)

Business of the Year Award – State Winners 
Australian Capital Territory Business of the Year – eWAY
New South Wales Business of the Year – Machinery Automation & Robotics
Queensland Business of the Year – Centor Architectural
Western Australian Business of the Year – TraxOn Industries Pty. Ltd.
South Australian Business of the Year – Coopers Brewery
Victorian Business of the Year – Wild Action Productions
Northern Territory Business of the Year – N/A
Tasmanian Business of the Year – Bruny Island Charters and Tasman Island Cruises

Small Business Award – State Winners 
Australian Capital Territory Small Business Award – eWAY
New South Wales Small Business Award – GoGet CarShare
Queensland Small Business Award – Clearmake
Western Australian Small Business Award – TraxOn Industries Pty. Ltd.
South Australian Small Business Award – Port Adelaide Brewing Company Pty. Ltd. t/a Port Dock Brewery Hotel
Victorian Small Business Award – Wild Action Productions
Northern Territory Small Business Award – NT Technology Pty. Ltd.
Tasmanian Small Business Award – Bruny Island Charters and Tasman Island Cruises

Medium Business Award – State Winners  
Australian Capital Territory Medium Business Award – Stratsec
New South Wales Medium Business Award – NA (not awarded)
Queensland Medium Business Award – Centor Architectural
Western Australian Medium Business Award – Carr Civil Contracting Pty. Ltd.
South Australian Medium Business Award – Coopers Brewery
Victorian Medium Business Award – Atlantic Group (v)
Northern Territory Medium Business Award – Security & Technology Services (NT) Pty. Ltd.
Tasmanian Medium Business Award – Penguin Composites

Micro-Business Award – State Winners 
Australian Capital Territory Micro-Business Award – Hamperesque
New South Wales Micro-Business Award – LaRoo
Queensland Micro-Business Award – momentum
Western Australian Micro-Business Award – Elliott's Small Engines
South Australian Micro-Business Award – Stress Free Marine Pty. Ltd.
Victorian Micro-Business Award – Find a Babysitter.com.au
Northern Territory Micro-Business Award – Advanced Body Image
Tasmanian Micro-Business Award – The Maria Island Walk

Innovation Award – State Winners 
Australian Capital Territory Innovation Award – Codarra Advanced Systems
New South Wales Innovation Award – Machinery Automation & Robotics
Queensland Innovation Award – Centor Architectural
Western Australian Innovation Award – Smart Burn Pty. Ltd.
South Australian Innovation Award – EVRsafe Marine Technologies
Victorian Innovation Award – Roma Food Products
Northern Territory Innovation Award – N/A
Tasmanian Innovation Award – N/A

Social Responsibility Award – State Winners 
Australian Capital Territory Social Responsibility Award – All Things Chocolate
New South Wales Social Responsibility Award – Bholu Pty. Ltd.
Queensland Social Responsibility Award – Thomson Adsett Architects
Western Australian Social Responsibility Award – South West Audiology and Hearing Services
South Australian Social Responsibility Award – Marion Physiotherapy
Victorian Social Responsibility Award – Etiko Fair Trade
Northern Territory Social Responsibility Award – Jape Furnishing Superstore
Tasmanian Social Responsibility Award – Bruny Island Charters and Tasman Island Cruises

2009

National Awardees 
Telstra Australian Business of the Year – The COACH Program (VIC)
Telstra Australian Medium Business Award – Point Project Management (ACT)
Telstra Australian Small Business Award – Edible Blooms (SA)
Telstra Australian Micro-Business Award – The COACH Program (VIC)
Telstra Australian Regional Business Award – N/A
Telstra Australian Innovation Award – Vaxine Pty. Ltd. (SA)
Telstra Australian Social Responsibility Award – R Radford and Son Pty. Ltd.

Business of the Year Award – State Winners 
Australian Capital Territory Business of the Year – Point Project Management
New South Wales Business of the Year – Publisher Textiles
Queensland Business of the Year – Tourstogo.com
Western Australian Business of the Year – Yahava KoffeeWorks
South Australian Business of the Year – Edible Blooms
Victorian Business of the Year – The COACH Program
Northern Territory Business of the Year – Gove Pharmacy
Tasmanian Business of the Year – Muir Engineering Pty. Ltd.

Small Business Award – State Winners 
Australian Capital Territory Small Business Award – PSI Asia Pacific
New South Wales Small Business Award – Unimail Pty. Ltd. 
Queensland Small Business Award – Aspire Retire Financial Services
Western Australian Small Business Award – Yahava KoffeeWorks
South Australian Small Business Award – Edible Blooms
Victorian Small Business Award – LIVE IN australia.com
Northern Territory Small Business Award – Gove Pharmacy
Tasmanian Small Business Award – The Maria Island Walk

Medium Business Award – State Winners  
Australian Capital Territory Medium Business Award – Point Project Management
New South Wales Medium Business Award – Kimberley Kampers Pty. Ltd.
Queensland Medium Business Award – Trilby Misso Lawyers Limited
Western Australian Medium Business Award – Lavan Legal
South Australian Medium Business Award – Solar Shop Australia
Victorian Medium Business Award – Revolution IT
Northern Territory Medium Business Award – N/A
Tasmanian Medium Business Award – Muir Engineering Pty. Ltd.

Micro-Business Award – State Winners 
Australian Capital Territory Micro-Business Award – Succeed Personal Development
New South Wales Micro-Business Award – Publisher Textiles
Queensland Micro-Business Award – Tourstogo.com
Western Australian Micro-Business Award – Loose Goose Chalets
South Australian Micro-Business Award – The Trademan
Victorian Micro-Business Award – The COACH Program
Northern Territory Micro-Business Award – N/A
Tasmanian Micro-Business Award – Brighton Hardware

Innovation Award – State Winners 
Australian Capital Territory Innovation Award – N/A
New South Wales Innovation Award – Kimberley Kampers Pty. Ltd.
Queensland Innovation Award – Australian Innovative Systems Pty. Ltd.
Western Australian Innovation Award – Sea To Summit
South Australian Innovation Award – Vaxine Pty. Ltd.
Victorian Innovation Award – The COACH Program
Northern Territory Innovation Award – Crowne Plaza Alice Springs
Tasmanian Innovation Award – HealthCare Software Pty. Ltd.

Social Responsibility Award – State Winners 
Australian Capital Territory Social Responsibility Award – Point Project Management
New South Wales Social Responsibility Award – Financial Management Solution
Queensland Social Responsibility Award – Natural Resource Assessments Pty. Ltd. (Trading as NRA Environmental Consultants)
Western Australian Social Responsibility Award – Addwealth Pty. Ltd.
South Australian Social Responsibility Award – Clarke and Associates Veterinary Practice
Victorian Social Responsibility Award – R Radford & Son Pty. Ltd.
Northern Territory Social Responsibility Award – N/A
Tasmanian Social Responsibility Award – braaap Pty. ltd.

2010

National Awardees 
Telstra Australian Business of the Year – stratsec (ACT)
Telstra Australian Medium Business Award – stratsec (ACT)
Telstra Australian Small Business Award – City Ceramics (NT)
Telstra Australian Micro-Business Award – teachers.on.net (SA)
Telstra Australian Regional Business Award – Kelly Engineering (SA)
Telstra Australian Innovation Award – Soprano Design (NSW)
Telstra Social Responsibility Award – Northern Project Contracting (QLD)

Business of the Year Award – State Winners 
Australian Capital Territory Business of the Year – stratsec
New South Wales Business of the Year – Intact Group Pty. Ltd.
Queensland Business of the Year – Abacus ALS
Western Australian Business of the Year – KAPP Engineering
South Australian Business of the Year – Kelly Engineering
Victorian Business of the Year – Melbourne Medical Deputising Service
Northern Territory Business of the Year – City Ceramics
Tasmanian Business of the Year – Maintenance Systems Solutions

Small Business Award – State Winners 
Australian Capital Territory Small Business Award – Today's Homes & Lifestyle Pty. Ltd.
New South Wales Small Business Award – Intact Group Pty. Ltd.
Queensland Small Business Award – Aqualogical Pty. Ltd.
Western Australian Small Business Award – Electro Medical Group
South Australian Small Business Award – Kelly Engineering
Victorian Small Business Award – International Medical Recruitment Pty. Ltd.
Northern Territory Small Business Award – City Ceramics
Tasmanian Small Business Award – InSPArations day spa

Medium Business Award – State Winners  
Australian Capital Territory Medium Business Award – stratsec
New South Wales Medium Business Award – Ezypay Pty. Ltd.
Queensland Medium Business Award – Abacus ALS
Western Australian Medium Business Award – Handley Surveys
South Australian Medium Business Award – N/A
Victorian Medium Business Award – N/A
Northern Territory Medium Business Award – Jape Furnishing Superstore
Tasmanian Medium Business Award – Maintenance Systems Solutions

Micro-Business Award – State Winners 
Australian Capital Territory Micro-Business Award – Makin Trax Australia
New South Wales Micro-Business Award – Sydney Writers' Centre
Queensland Micro-Business Award – Calamvale Veterinary Clinic
Western Australian Micro-Business Award – KAPP Engineering
South Australian Micro-Business Award – teachers.on.net
Victorian Micro-Business Award – ATS Australian Educational Group Pty. Ltd.
Northern Territory Micro-Business Award – Penny's Fancy Dress
Tasmanian Micro-Business Award – Catnip Cattery

Innovation Award – State Winners 
Australian Capital Territory Innovation Award – Viridis E3
New South Wales Innovation Award – Soprano Design
Queensland Innovation Award – Signmanager Pty Ltd
Western Australian Innovation Award – Quicklock Partitions
South Australian Innovation Award – Neutrog Australia Pty. Ltd.
Victorian Innovation Award – SIDRA Solutions
Northern Territory Innovation Award – HG Fitness
Tasmanian Innovation Award – Insight4

Social Responsibility Award – State Winners 
Australian Capital Territory Social Responsibility Award – Richard Luton Properties
New South Wales Social Responsibility Award – ChewYings Lawn & Horticulture
Queensland Social Responsibility Award – Northern Project Contracting 
Western Australian Social Responsibility Award – The Bodhi Tree
South Australian Social Responsibility Award – Neutrog Australia Pty. Ltd.
Victorian Social Responsibility Award – Melbourne Medical Deputising Service
Northern Territory Social Responsibility Award – Greenies Real Food
Tasmanian Social Responsibility Award – Park Homes

2011
This was the last year in which the Telstra Australian Innovation Award was presented at the Telstra Business Awards.

National Awardees 
Telstra Australian Business of the Year – Australian Pressure Testing Services (APTS) (WA) 
Telstra Australian Medium Business Award – Australian Pressure Testing Services (APTS) (WA) / Janison (NSW)
Telstra Australian Small Business Award – Flash Fotos (QLD)
Telstra Australian Micro-Business Award – Darwin Day Surgery (NT)
Telstra Australian Regional Business Award – N/A
Telstra Australian Innovation Award – Colmax Glass Pty. Ltd. (NSW)

Business of the Year Award – State Winners 
Australian Capital Territory Business of the Year – Luton Properties
New South Wales Business of the Year – 
Queensland Business of the Year – Stream Group Aust Pty. Ltd.
Western Australian Business of the Year – Australian Pressure Testing Services (APTS)
South Australian Business of the Year – Beerenberg Farm
Victorian Business of the Year – easyweddings.com.au
Northern Territory Business of the Year – Abode New Homes Pty. Ltd.
Tasmanian Business of the Year – Plants Management Australia Pty. Ltd.

Small Business Award – State Winners 
Australian Capital Territory Small Business Award – Interaction Consulting Group
New South Wales Small Business Award – Ecoline Pty. Ltd.
Queensland Small Business Award – Flash Fotos
Western Australian Small Business Award – Gnarabar
South Australian Small Business Award – Health and Life
Victorian Small Business Award – easyweddings.com.au
Northern Territory Small Business Award – Abode New Homes Pty. Ltd.
Tasmanian Small Business Award – Tas Petroleum

Medium Business Award – State Winners  
Australian Capital Territory Medium Business Award – Luton Properties
New South Wales Medium Business Award – Janison
Queensland Medium Business Award – Stream Group Aust Pty. Ltd.
Western Australian Medium Business Award – Australian Pressure Testing Services (APTS)
South Australian Medium Business Award – Beerenberg Farm
Victorian Medium Business Award – PRESHAFOOD LTD
Northern Territory Medium Business Award – Area9 IT Solutions
Tasmanian Medium Business Award – N/A

Micro-Business Award – State Winners 
Australian Capital Territory Micro-Business Award – Learning Options
New South Wales Micro-Business Award – Motivate You Fitness & Personal Training
Queensland Micro-Business Award – JADE Corporate & Community Development
Western Australian Micro-Business Award – Veritas Engineering Pty. Ltd.
South Australian Micro-Business Award – Brazcom Imports
Victorian Micro-Business Award – The Wall Sticker Company
Northern Territory Micro-Business Award – Darwin Day Surgery
Tasmanian Micro-Business Award – N/A

Innovation Award – State Winners 
Australian Capital Territory Innovation Award – Lucy Media
New South Wales Innovation Award – Colmax Glass Pty. Ltd.
Queensland Innovation Award – Zehnder Gluten Free
Western Australian Innovation Award – RePipe Pty. Ltd.
South Australian Innovation Award – SCF Group
Victorian Innovation Award – BikeExchange.com.au
Northern Territory Innovation Award – Darwin Day Surgery
Tasmanian Innovation Award – Plants Management Australia Pty. Ltd.

Social Responsibility Award – State Winners 
Australian Capital Territory Social Responsibility Award – PCA People Pty. Ltd.
New South Wales Social Responsibility Award – N/A
Queensland Social Responsibility Award – Samies Girl Seafoods
Western Australian Social Responsibility Award – RePipe Pty. Ltd.
South Australian Social Responsibility Award – N/A
Victorian Social Responsibility Award – m.a.d.woman - making a difference
Northern Territory Social Responsibility Award – Area9 IT Solutions
Tasmanian Social Responsibility Award – N/A

Regional Business Award – State Winners 
Australian Capital Territory Regional Business Award – N/A
New South Wales Regional Business Award – N/A
Queensland Regional Business Award – Flash Fotos
Western Australian Regional Business Award – Gnarabar
South Australian Regional Business Award – Cowell Electric Supply Pty. Ltd.
Victorian Regional Business Award – Blackmore Holdings Pty. Ltd.
Northern Territory Regional Business Award – Eldorado Motor Inn Golden Chain
Tasmanian Regional Business Award – M & J Baker Farms Pty. Ltd.

2012
The Telstra Australian Start Up Award was inaugurated in 2012.

National Awardees 
Telstra Australian Business of the Year – BikeExchange.com.au (VIC)
Telstra Australian Medium Business Award – UON Pty. Ltd. (WA)
Telstra Australian Small Business Award – BikeExchange.com.au (VIC)
Telstra Australian Micro-Business Award – Shima Wasabi (TAS)
Telstra Australian Regional Business Award – John Nitschke Drilling Pty. Ltd. (SA) 
Telstra Australian Start Up Award – Sitemed (SA)

Business of the Year Award – State Winners 
Australian Capital Territory Business of the Year – Point Project Management
New South Wales Business of the Year – Laservision Pty. Ltd.
Queensland Business of the Year – Winangali Pty Ltd
Western Australian Business of the Year – N/A
South Australian Business of the Year – John Nitschke Drilling Pty Ltd
Victorian Business of the Year – BikeExchange.com.au
Northern Territory Business of the Year – Security & Technology Services
Tasmanian Business of the Year – TasIVF Pty. Ltd.

Small Business Award – State Winners 
Australian Capital Territory Small Business Award – Provincial Plants and Landscapes
New South Wales Small Business Award – Laservision Pty. Ltd.
Queensland Small Business Award – A&L Laurent Pty. Ltd.
Western Australian Small Business Award – Emission Assessments Pty. Ltd.
South Australian Small Business Award – E-Cycle Recovery Pty. Ltd.
Victorian Small Business Award – BikeExchange.com.au
Northern Territory Small Business Award – Saffrron Restaurant
Tasmanian Small Business Award – TasIVF Pty. Ltd.

Medium Business Award – State Winners  
Australian Capital Territory Medium Business Award – Point Project Management
New South Wales Medium Business Award – Red Lantern
Queensland Medium Business Award – Paronella Park
Western Australian Medium Business Award – UON Pty. Ltd.
South Australian Medium Business Award – John Nitschke Drilling Pty. Ltd.
Victorian Medium Business Award – Kiandra IT
Northern Territory Medium Business Award – Security & Technology Services
Tasmanian Medium Business Award – Novaris Pty. Ltd.

Micro-Business Award – State Winners 
Australian Capital Territory Micro-Business Award – Transformed Pty. Ltd.
New South Wales Micro-Business Award – Stoneset Permeable Paving
Queensland Micro-Business Award – Winangali Pty. Ltd.
Western Australian Micro-Business Award – LushTV
South Australian Micro-Business Award – Tour Barossa
Victorian Micro-Business Award – Firestarter Pty. Ltd.
Northern Territory Micro-Business Award – Alice Pool and Spa Centre
Tasmanian Micro-Business Award – Shima Wasabi

Regional Business Award – State Winners 
Australian Capital Territory Regional Business Award – N/A
New South Wales Regional Business Award – Hume Building Society
Queensland Regional Business Award – Paronella Park
Western Australian Regional Business Award – Skydive Jurien Bay
South Australian Regional Business Award – John Nitschke Drilling Pty. Ltd.
Victorian Regional Business Award – Mobius Institute Pty. Ltd.
Northern Territory Regional Business Award – Coomalie Air Maintenance Pty. Ltd.
Tasmanian Regional Business Award – Shima Wasabi

Start Up Award – State Winners  
Australian Capital Territory Start Up Award – Swish Education
New South Wales Start Up Award – Evolve Orthodontics
Queensland Start Up Award – The Vet Lounge
Western Australian Start Up Award – Mosmans Restaurant
South Australian Start Up Award – Sitemed
Victorian Start Up Award – KeepCup Pty. Ltd.
Northern Territory Start Up Award – The Chiropractic Place
Tasmanian Start Up Award – MacTavish West Pty. Ltd.

2013

National Awardees 
Telstra Australian Business of the Year – Bruny Island Cheese Co. (TAS)
Telstra Australia Medium Business Award – Becker Helicopter Services Pty. Ltd. (QLD)
Telstra Australian Small Business Award – Bruny Island Cheese Co. (TAS)
Telstra Australian Micro-Business Award – ENIQUEST (QLD)
Telstra Australian Regional Business Award – iKOU (NSW)
Telstra Australian Start Up Award – health.com.au (VIC)

Business of the Year Award – State Winners 
Australian Capital Territory Business of the Year – Rudds Consulting Engineers
New South Wales Business of the Year – Fifth Quadrant
Queensland Business of the Year – Burleigh Brewing Company
Western Australian Business of the Year – ADAMS Group
South Australian Business of the Year – Suntrix Pty. Ltd.
Victorian Business of the Year – braaap
Northern Territory Business of the Year – Top End Pest Control
Tasmanian Business of the Year – Bruny Island Cheese Co.

Small Business Award – State Winners 
Australian Capital Territory Small Business Award – Residential Reports
New South Wales Small Business Award – Marketing Mechanics
Queensland Small Business Award – Burleigh Brewing Company
Western Australian Small Business Award – Muway Constructions
South Australian Small Business Award – BRS
Victorian Small Business Award – braaap
Northern Territory Small Business Award – Top End Pest Control
Tasmanian Small Business Award – Bruny Island Cheese Co.

Medium Business Award – State Winners  
Australian Capital Territory Medium Business Award – Rudds Consulting Engineers
New South Wales Medium Business Award – Fifth Quadrant
Queensland Medium Business Award – Becker Helicopter Services Pty. Ltd.
Western Australian Medium Business Award – ADAMS Group
South Australian Medium Business Award – Suntrix Pty. Ltd.
Victorian Medium Business Award – Connective
Northern Territory Medium Business Award – Cairns Industries Pty. Ltd.
Tasmanian Medium Business Award – Collins SBA Complete Wealth Specialist

Micro-Business Award – State Winners 
Australian Capital Territory Micro-Business Award – Canberra Furnished Accommodation
New South Wales Micro-Business Award – Wicked Berries Pty. Ltd.
Queensland Micro-Business Award – ENIQUEST
Western Australian Micro-Business Award – StepBeyond Business Advisors
South Australian Micro-Business Award – Synotronics Pty. Ltd.
Victorian Micro-Business Award – Great Ocean Road Surf Tours
Northern Territory Micro-Business Award – italklibrary
Tasmanian Micro-Business Award – Jump Tours

Regional Business Award – State Winners 
Australian Capital Territory Regional Business Award – N/A
New South Wales Regional Business Award – iKOU
Queensland Regional Business Award – General Trade Industries (GTI)
Western Australian Regional Business Award – Muway Constructions
South Australian Regional Business Award – Richard Gunner's Fine Meats
Victorian Regional Business Award – Boundary Bend Olives
Northern Territory Regional Business Award – Cairns Industries Pty Ltd
Tasmanian Regional Business Award – Bruny Island Cheese Co.

Start Up Award – State Winners  
Australian Capital Territory Start Up Award – Shop Handmade Canberra
New South Wales Start Up Award – WiTH Collective
Queensland Start Up Award – Bli Bli House
Western Australian Start Up Award – NPB Security
South Australian Start Up Award – Off-Grid Energy Australia
Victorian Start Up Award – health.com.au
Northern Territory Start Up Award – N/A
Tasmanian Start Up Award – Tasmanian Air Adventures

2014

National Awardees 
Telstra Australian Business of the Year – REDARC (SA)
Telstra Australia Medium Business Award – REDARC (SA)
Telstra Australian Small Business Award – Lark Distillery (TAS)
Telstra Australian Micro-Business Award – Urban Escape (VIC)
Telstra Australian Regional Business Award – Stone & Wood Brewing Co. (NSW)
Telstra Australian Start Up Award – Country Wellness Pharmacy (NT)

Business of the Year Award – State Winners 
Australian Capital Territory Business of the Year – Intelledox
New South Wales Business of the Year – Elevate Education Pty. Ltd.
Queensland Business of the Year – Carbon Media
Western Australian Business of the Year – Monford Group Pty. Ltd.
South Australian Business of the Year – REDARC
Victorian Business of the Year – Smile Solutions
Northern Territory Business of the Year – ServiceM8
Tasmanian Business of the Year – Lark Distillery

Small Business Award – State Winners 
Australian Capital Territory Small Business Award – Today's Homes
New South Wales Small Business Award – Elevate Education Pty. Ltd.
Queensland Small Business Award – Carbon Media
Western Australian Small Business Award – TWD
South Australian Small Business Award – Clare Valley Motel
Victorian Small Business Award – NSR Australia
Northern Territory Small Business Award – Lark Distillery
Tasmanian Small Business Award – UB COOL PTY LTD

Medium Business Award – State Winners  
Australian Capital Territory Medium Business Award – Intelledox
New South Wales Medium Business Award – Booktopia
Queensland Medium Business Award – Trailers 2000 Pty. Ltd.
Western Australian Medium Business Award – Monford Group Pty. Ltd.
South Australian Medium Business Award – REDARC
Victorian Medium Business Award – Smile Solutions
Northern Territory Medium Business Award – Killarney Homes
Tasmanian Medium Business Award – Stornoway

Micro-Business Award – State Winners 
Australian Capital Territory Micro-Business Award – Solace Creations
New South Wales Micro-Business Award – Bondi Chai
Queensland Micro-Business Award – Glitter and Dance Fabric Specialists
Western Australian Micro-Business Award – Armed For Life 
South Australian Micro-Business Award – Virtual Ad Agency
Victorian Micro-Business Award – Urban Escape
Northern Territory Micro-Business Award – ServiceM8
Tasmanian Micro-Business Award – Handbuilt Creative

Regional Business Award – State Winners 
Australian Capital Territory Regional Business Award – N/A
New South Wales Regional Business Award – Stone & Wood Brewing Company
Queensland Regional Business Award – Trailers 2000 Pty. Ltd.
Western Australian Regional Business Award – Mandurah Cruises & Gift Shop
South Australian Regional Business Award – Bowhill Engineering
Victorian Regional Business Award – The Enchanted Adventure Garden
Northern Territory Regional Business Award – Power Projects NT
Tasmanian Regional Business Award – Stornoway

Start Up Award – State Winners  
Australian Capital Territory Start Up Award – Cogito Group
New South Wales Start Up Award – Paws for Life
Queensland Start Up Award – Cornerstone Recruitment
Western Australian Start Up Award – Rawsome
South Australian Start Up Award – Eire Café
Victorian Start Up Award – Crisp Creative Salad
Northern Territory Start Up Award – Country Wellness Pharmacy
Tasmanian Start Up Award – Your Path to Health

2015

National Awardees 
Telstra Australian Business of the Year – Executive Risk Solutions (WA)
Telstra Australia Medium Business Award – Executive Risk Solutions (WA)
Telstra Australian Small Business Award – Cargo Crew (VIC)
Telstra Australian Micro-Business Award – Nexba Beverages (NSW)
Telstra Australian Regional Business Award – Southern Cotton Pty. Ltd. (NSW)
Telstra Australian Start Up Award – First Electrical (VIC)

Business of the Year Award – State Winners 
Australian Capital Territory Business of the Year – Red Robot
New South Wales Business of the Year – Amazonia
Queensland Business of the Year – Beginning Boutique
Western Australian Business of the Year – Executive Risk Solutions
South Australian Business of the Year – HEGS Australia
Victorian Business of the Year – Furst Electrical
Northern Territory Business of the Year – Country Solar NT
Tasmanian Business of the Year – Francesca Collections

Small Business Award – State Winners 
Australian Capital Territory Small Business Award – Red Robot
New South Wales Small Business Award – Amazonia
Queensland Small Business Award – Beginning Boutique
Western Australian Small Business Award – injuryConnect
South Australian Small Business Award – Kalleske Wines
Victorian Small Business Award – Cargo Crew
Northern Territory Small Business Award – Northtech Solutions
Tasmanian Small Business Award – Francesca Collections

Medium Business Award – State Winners  
Australian Capital Territory Medium Business Award – Synergy Group 
New South Wales Medium Business Award – Ezypay
Queensland Medium Business Award – Tú Projects
Western Australian Medium Business Award – Executive Risk Solutions
South Australian Medium Business Award – Princess Royal Station
Victorian Medium Business Award – Setec
Northern Territory Medium Business Award – Country Solar NT
Tasmanian Medium Business Award – N/A

Micro-Business Award – State Winners 
Australian Capital Territory Micro-Business Award – Barmco Mana Partnership
New South Wales Micro-Business Award – Nexba Beverages
Queensland Micro-Business Award – Styling You with Nikki Parkinson
Western Australian Micro-Business Award – Fordham & Roast
South Australian Micro-Business Award – Posture Podiatry
Victorian Micro-Business Award – Elite Executive Services Pty Ltd
Northern Territory Micro-Business Award – Stepping Stones In Life Therapy Service
Tasmanian Micro-Business Award – Shift Property Styling

Regional Business Award – State Winners 
Australian Capital Territory Regional Business Award – N/A
New South Wales Regional Business Award – Southern Cotton Pty Ltd
Queensland Regional Business Award – Cape York Camping Punsand Bay
Western Australian Regional Business Award – Great Southern Distilling Company
South Australian Regional Business Award – Princess Royal Station
Victorian Regional Business Award – Skin Smart Australia
Northern Territory Regional Business Award – N/A
Tasmanian Regional Business Award – Bridestowe Estate

Start Up Award – State Winners  
Australian Capital Territory Start Up Award – Alliance Leasing
New South Wales Start Up Award – Flow Athletic
Queensland Start Up Award – Ecoriginals
Western Australian Start Up Award – KBSS Engineering
South Australian Start Up Award – HEGS Australia
Victorian Start Up Award – Furst Electrical
Northern Territory Start Up Award – Plumbing NT Pty Ltd
Tasmanian Start Up Award – Montacute Boutique Bunkhouse

2016 
The Telstra Australian Regional Business Award was not awarded in 2016, while the Telstra Australian Start Up Award became the 'New Business' Award, and the Telstra Australian Charity Award was inaugurated.

National Awardees 
Telstra Australian Business of the Year – Spell and the Gypsy Collective (NSW)
Telstra Australia Medium Business Award – Jewel Fine Foods (NSW)
Telstra Australian Small Business Award – Spell and the Gypsy Collective (NSW)
Telstra Australian Micro-Business Award – iSimulate (ACT)
Telstra Australian New Business Award – Tow.com.au (QLD)
Telstra Australian Charity Award – Snowdome Foundation (VIC)

Business of the Year Award – State Winners 
Australian Capital Territory Business of the Year – 
New South Wales Business of the Year – Spell and The Gypsy Collective
Queensland Business of the Year – QUIK CORP
Western Australian Business of the Year – PeopleSense
South Australian Business of the Year – Adelaide Green Clean
Victorian Business of the Year – Vinomofo
Northern Territory Business of the Year – HPA "Helping People Achieve"
Tasmanian Business of the Year – Bridestowe Estate

Small Business Award – State Winners 
Australian Capital Territory Small Business Award – The Rehabilitation Specialists
New South Wales Small Business Award – Spell and The Gypsy Collective
Queensland Small Business Award – In Safe Hands Educators In Safety
Western Australian Small Business Award – PeopleSense 
South Australian Small Business Award – Positive Lending Solutions
Victorian Small Business Award – b.box for kids
Northern Territory Small Business Award – Top End Medical Centre
Tasmanian Small Business Award – Bridestowe Estate

Medium Business Award – State Winners  
Australian Capital Territory Medium Business Award – Capital Airport Group
New South Wales Medium Business Award – Jewel Fine Foods
Queensland Medium Business Award – QUIK CORP
Western Australian Medium Business Award – ADAMS 
South Australian Medium Business Award – Barossa Fine Foods
Victorian Medium Business Award – Vinomofo
Northern Territory Medium Business Award – 
Tasmanian Medium Business Award –

Micro-Business Award – State Winners 
Australian Capital Territory Micro-Business Award – iSimulate
New South Wales Micro-Business Award – Rufus & Coco Pty Ltd
Queensland Micro-Business Award – Lingua Franca
Western Australian Micro-Business Award – Health Safety Works
South Australian Micro-Business Award – Nature's Quest
Victorian Micro-Business Award – Little Innoscents
Northern Territory Micro-Business Award – Champagne Dance Fitness Studio
Tasmanian Micro-Business Award – Mode Electrical

New Business Award – State Winners  
Australian Capital Territory New Business Award – Relken Engineering Pty Ltd
New South Wales New Business Award – Sendle
Queensland New Business Award – Tow.com.au
Western Australian New Business Award – Proactiv Payroll
South Australian New Business Award – Adelaide Green Clean
Victorian New Business Award – Artlivemedia
Northern Territory New Business Award – Territory Logistic Solutions Pty Ltd
Tasmanian New Business Award – Cataract on Paterson

Charity Award – State Winners  
Australian Capital Territory Charity Award – Ronald McDonald House Canberra
New South Wales Charity Award – Butterfly Foundation
Queensland Charity Award – World Wellness Group
Western Australian Charity Award – 
South Australian Charity Award – Barkuma
Victorian Charity Award – Snowdome Foundation
Northern Territory Charity Award – HPA "Helping People Achieve"
Tasmanian Charity Award – Hobart City Mission

2017

National Awardees 
Telstra Australian Business of the Year – GenWise Health (SA)
Telstra Australia Medium Business Award – ELK (VIC)
Telstra Australian Small Business Award – Love to Dream (NSW)
Telstra Australian Micro-Business Award – GenWise Health (SA)
Telstra Australian New Business Award – Over the Moo (NSW)
Telstra Australian Charity Award – MS Research Australia (NSW)

Business of the Year Award – State Winners 
Australian Capital Territory Business of the Year – ABS Façade
New South Wales Business of the Year – MS Research Australia
Queensland Business of the Year – Family Doctors Plus
Western Australian Business of the Year – Great Southern Distilling Company
South Australian Business of the Year – GenWise Health
Victorian Business of the Year – Hivint
Northern Territory Business of the Year – HiQA Geotechnical
Tasmanian Business of the Year – BIG hART

Small Business Award – State Winners 
Australian Capital Territory Small Business Award – Capital Chemist Wanniassa
New South Wales Small Business Award – Love To Dream
Queensland Small Business Award – Agri Labour Australia
Western Australian Small Business Award – Great Southern Distilling Company
South Australian Small Business Award – Kid Sense Child Development
Victorian Small Business Award – TM Insight
Northern Territory Small Business Award – Northern Territory Veterinary Services
Tasmanian Small Business Award – Salamanca Dental

Medium Business Award – State Winners  
Australian Capital Territory Medium Business Award – ABS Façade
New South Wales Medium Business Award – Prospa
Queensland Medium Business Award – NIOA
Western Australian Medium Business Award – ENDURACLAD INTERNATIONAL
South Australian Medium Business Award – L.V. DOHNT & CO. Pty Ltd
Victorian Medium Business Award – ELK
Northern Territory Medium Business Award – HiQA Geotechnical
Tasmanian Medium Business Award – N/A

Micro-Business Award – State Winners 
Australian Capital Territory Micro-Business Award – N/A
New South Wales Micro-Business Award – gemaker
Queensland Micro-Business Award – Mountain Bikes Direct
Western Australian Micro-Business Award – Hancock Creative
South Australian Micro-Business Award – GenWise Health
Victorian Micro-Business Award – Showkidz Management
Northern Territory Micro-Business Award – Nth Degree Engineering Services
Tasmanian Micro-Business Award – House of Dance Tasmania

New Business Award – State Winners  
Australian Capital Territory New Business Award – Dex
New South Wales New Business Award – Over The Moo
Queensland New Business Award – Family Doctors Plus
Western Australian New Business Award – Red Dirt Transport Services
South Australian New Business Award – Myriota
Victorian New Business Award – Hivint
Northern Territory New Business Award – Tutor Me (NT)
Tasmanian New Business Award – Ankalia Textiles

Charity Award – State Winners  
Australian Capital Territory Charity Award – N/A
New South Wales Charity Award – MS Research Australia
Queensland Charity Award – Youngcare
Western Australian Charity Award – Shalom House
South Australian Charity Award – N/A
Victorian Charity Award – sleepbus
Northern Territory Charity Award – Riding for the Disabled in the Top End
Tasmanian Charity Award – BIG hART

Telstra Business Women's Awards

2015 Women's Awardees 
 Captain Mona Shindy – Government and Academia Award and Telstra Business Women of the Year
 Jessica May – Start Up Award
 Marie Piccone- Australian Entrepreneur Award
 Kate Thiele – South Australian Business Woman of the Year & South Australian For Purpose and Social Enterprise Award and Australian for Purpose and Social Enterprise Award
 Katarina Carroll – Queensland Government and Academia Award and Australian Government and Academia Award
 Kim Tran – Young Business Women Award
 Belinda Brosnan – Queensland Start Up Award
 Marie Piccone – Queensland Entrepreneur Award
 Fiona Jose – Queensland for Purpose and Social Enterprise Award
 Dr Catherine Ball – Queensland Corporate and Private Award, Queensland Business Women of Year and Australian Corporate and Private Award
 Susie Upton – Queensland Young Business Women's Award
 Brigid Beilby – Northern Territory Start Up Award
 Mary Linnell – Northern Territory Entrepreneur Award
 Deborah Bampton – Northern Territory and Social Enterprise Award
 Deborah Hall – Northern Territory Government and Academia Award
 Brigid Beilby – Northern Territory Young Business Women's Award
 Mary Linnell – Northern Territory Business Woman of the Year
 April Armstrong – Western Australian Start-up Award
 Phyllis Narula – Western Australian Entrepreneur Award
 Angie Paskeviciu – Western Australian For Purpose and Social Enterprise Award
 Joanne Abbiss – Western Australian Government and Academia Award
 Jessica Barber – Western Australian Corporate and Private Award
 Kim Tran – Western Australian Young Business Women's Award
 Angie Paskevicius – Western Australian Business Woman of the Year
 Kate Thiele – South Australian Business Woman of the Year & South Australian For Purpose and Social Enterprise Award
 Sarah Bartholomeusz – South Australian Start-up Award
 Marissa Schulze – South Australian Entrepreneur Award
 Professor Pascale Quester – South Australian Government and Academia Award
 Michaela Webster – South Australian Corporate and Private Award
 Ashleigh Stiling – South Australian Young Business Women's Award

References

External links

Telstra
Australian awards
Business and industry awards
1992 establishments in Australia
Awards established in 1992